Roy Mbaeteka (born 13 February 2000) is a Nigerian gridiron football offensive tackle who is a free agent.

Career
Mbaeteka was born in Anambra, Nigeria and never played high school or college football. 

He was initially signed by the New York Giants on 8 April 2022, from the International Player Pathway Program. 

He was cut by the Giants on 29 September 2022. He was re-signed on 7 December but was released a week later.

References

External links
NFL profile

2000 births
Living people
American football offensive tackles
New York Giants players
Nigerian players of American football
People from Anambra State